Henry Frick may refer to: 

 Henry Clay Frick (1849–1919), American industrialist
 Henry Clay Frick II (1919–2007), American physician and professor
 Henry Frick (politician) (1795–1850), American politician and congressman